Anneke Borren   (born 1946) is a New Zealand potter. Her work is in the permanent collection of Te Papa, the Christchurch Art Gallery and the Sarjeant Gallery.

Biography 
Borren was born in Eindhoven in the Netherlands and emigrated to New Zealand in 1963, at the age of 16. She studied at the School of Fine Arts, Christchurch followed by studies in the Netherlands, Denmark and Sweden, including at the Industrial School of Arts in Gothenburg. In 1969 she set up a ceramic studio in Paraparaumu, north of Wellington. In 1994 she established 'Chez-Moi Pottery' studio at Paremata, Wellington. In 1984 she was artist-in-residence at Whanganui Polytechnic.

Borren has served two terms as president of the New Zealand Society of Potters.

Awards 
In 1984, a pot by Borren won the West Award from the New Zealand Academy of Fine Arts. Borren had the Member of the New Zealand Order of Merit (MNZM) conferred upon her in 2022.

Personal life 
Borren has two daughters with her partner bone carver Owen Mapp.

References

1946 births
Living people
Dutch emigrants to New Zealand
New Zealand potters
People from Eindhoven